Corporation is a Canadian business documentary television series which aired on CBC Television in 1975.

Premise
This series broadcast all but one of the National Film Board of Canada documentary films on the Steinberg grocery company, documenting the business life of the company. The films received co-operation and involvement from company leader Sam Steinberg. One of the documentaries, "After Mr. Sam", ran almost 78 minutes long and was not broadcast on CBC during this run.

Scheduling
This half-hour series was broadcast most Sundays at 2:00 p.m. (Eastern) from 16 February to 6 April 1975.

Episodes
 "Growth" describes the past and future development of the company
 "Real Estate" concerns the company's land holdings and their effect on residential patterns
 "International Operations" featured the results of Steinberg opening a store in Paris
 "The Market" documented the company's approach to managing its relationships with customers, competitors and suppliers
 "Motivation" documented the company's relationships with its workers
 "Bilingualism" documented the company's relationships with Quebec

References

External links
 
 Retailing Industries documentaries at the National Film Board of Canada

CBC Television original programming
1975 Canadian television series debuts
1975 Canadian television series endings
National Film Board of Canada documentary series
Documentary films about business
1970s Canadian documentary television series
Films about companies